was a short-lived province located in Hokkaidō.  It corresponded to modern-day Ishikari Subprefecture minus Chitose and Eniwa, all of Sorachi Subprefecture and the southern half of Kamikawa Subprefecture excluding Shimukappu

History
After 1869, the northern Japanese island was known as Hokkaido; and regional administrative subdivisions were identified, including Ishikari Province.
August 15, 1869 Ishikari province established with 9 districts
1872 Census finds a population of 6,003
1882 Provinces dissolved in Hokkaidō.

Districts
Ishikari (石狩郡)
Sapporo (札幌郡) Dissolved September 1, 1996 when Hiroshima Town became Kitahiroshima City
Yūbari (夕張郡)
Kabato (樺戸郡)
Sorachi (空知郡)
Uryū (雨竜郡)
Kamikawa (上川郡)
Atsuta (厚田郡)
Hamamasu (浜益郡)

Notes

References
 Nussbaum, Louis-Frédéric and Käthe Roth. (2005).  Japan encyclopedia. Cambridge: Harvard University Press. ;  OCLC 58053128

Other websites 

  Murdoch's map of provinces, 1903

States and territories established in 1869
1882 disestablishments in Japan
Former provinces of Japan
1869 establishments in Japan